This is a partial list of known or supposed Hungarian loanwords in English:

 biro  From László Bíró, the Hungarian inventor of the ballpoint pen. Bíró originally means judge.
 coach  From kocsi, a horse‐drawn wagon with springs above the axles. Named after the village of Kocs in which this type of vehicle was invented. The verb 'to coach' is also derived from this root.
 czardas  From csárdás, a Hungarian folk dance. Csárda also means 'tavern'.
 Dobos torte or Dobosh  From Dobos torta, "Dobos cake". After confectioner József C. Dobos. Dobos originally means drummer.
 fogas an Eastern European species of fish (Sander lucioperca), cf. zander.
 forint the currency of Hungary since 1946 (also between 1325-1553 and 1750-1892). Originally derived from Italian "fiorino," name of the Florentine currency. Cognate with English "florin" (see also pengő).
 friska From friss, a fast section of music, often associated with czardas dances (cf. lassan).
 goulash  From gulyás, a type of stew known in Hungarian as gulyás. In Hungary, 'gulyásleves' is a soup dish; leves meaning soup. Gulyás also means 'herdsman' dealing with cattle, as the noun gulya is the Hungarian word for cattle herd. (This can cause confusion with native Hungarian speakers, as Hungarians generally understand unqualified "gulyás" to mean "gulyásleves", the soup, instead of referring to the international goulash as "pörkölt".)
 hajduk From hajdúk, "bandits" (plural of hajdú). Outlaw, guerilla fighter. The original Hungarian meaning was "cattle drover". 
 halászlé or Fisherman's Soup, a very hot and spicy river fish soup with a lot of paprika. (The actual Hungarian halászlé is not always made with hot paprika, unlike the internationally known soup.)
 hussar  From Hungarian huszár, a light cavalry soldier. The Hungarian word originally meant "freebooter" and was further derived via Old Serbian husar, gusar, gursar ("pirate") from Italian corsaro ("pirate"), i.e. the same root as that of English corsair. 
 shako or tsako  From csákó süveg, 'peaked cap', a stiff military hat with a high crown and plume.
 tokaji or tokay From tokaji aszú, the name of the wine from Tokaj, the centre of the local wine-growing district Tokaj-Hegyalja.
 vashegyite a mineral (hydrated basic aluminum phosphate), named after Vashegy ("iron mountain"), the old Hungarian name for the village of Železník, Slovakia where it was discovered.
 verbunkos  a Hungarian men's folk dance and musical style (itself coming from German Werbung - meaning "military recruitment" here).
 vizsla or vizla From vizsla, a Hungarian breed of hunting dog.

See also 
 Lists of English words of international origin

References

Hungarian
English words
English words